Beith Football Club were a football club based at Bellsdale Park in Beith, Scotland. The club were members of the Scottish Football League from 1923 to 1926.

History
The club was initially formed in 1875 and were founder members of the Ayrshire Football Association in 1877, but went into abeyance in 1883 and did not re-emerge fully until 1888. Nicknamed 'the cabinet makers', they joined the Ayrshire Football League in 1891 and would later play in the Scottish Football Combination, winning that competition in 1905. Around this time the club featured goalkeeper Hugh McDonald, who later had some success at Woolwich Arsenal. They eventually ended up in the Western League, which was incorporated by the Scottish Football League as its new Third Division for the 1923–24 season.

Beith lasted the Division's three seasons, finishing 7th, 13th and 12th, but were not retained by the League. The club joined the Scottish Football Alliance, playing against Galston and reserve teams of the Scottish Football League First Division clubs. Beith won the Scottish Qualifying Cup in 1928 and won the Scottish Qualifying Cup South in 1932, 1933 and 1935. When the First Division clubs decided that only their reserve teams could play in their reserve league, Beith were left without a competition to play in. The club decided in 1938 to leave the senior ranks and become Beith Juniors. and join the Western League North Division for 1939–40 season.

Stadium
1875–1882 Gateside Toll
1882–1883 Marshalland
1888–1894 Knockbuckle
1894–1903 James Meadow (Muir Field)
1903–1915 Glebe Park
1919 Kersland Field Glengarnock
1920–1938 Bellsdale Park.

Honours
Scottish Combination League
Champions 1904–05
Scottish Qualifying Cup
Winners 1928
Scottish Qualifying Cup South
Winners 1932, 1933, 1935
Ayrshire FA Challenge Cup
Winners 1880, 1924, 1927
North Ayrshire Cup
Winners 1906, 1924, 1927
Ayrshire Qualifying Cup
Winners 1927, 1928
Ayrshire Consolation Cup
Winners 1904
Ayr Charity Cup
Winners 1908
Kilmarnock Charity Cup
Winners 1881

References

 Twydell, Dave (1993). Rejected FC Glasgow & District. Yore Publishing
 Aitken, John (2013). The Scottish Football League 125. Scottish Non League publishing
 Aitken, John (2005). West of Scotland Juniors. Scottish Non League publishing
 Aitken, John (2013). The Scottish Junior Football Association 125 years. Scottish Non League publishing

External links
Beith Historical Kits

 
Defunct football clubs in Scotland
Association football clubs established in 1888
Association football clubs disestablished in 1938
Football in North Ayrshire
Scottish Football League teams
1888 establishments in Scotland
1938 disestablishments in Scotland
Beith